Brad Anderson (born 6 May 1981) is a British professional motocross rider three time European champion. He competes with #60.

Achievements

References

External links
 Brad Andenson at Pro Taper

Living people
1981 births
British motocross riders
Place of birth missing (living people)